A brickfilm is a film made using Lego bricks, or other similar plastic construction toys. They are usually created using stop motion animation, computer-generated imagery (CGI) or traditional animation and sometimes include live action films featuring plastic construction toys (or representations of them). The term “brick film” was coined by Jason Rowoldt, founder of Brickfilms.com.

History

1970s and 1980s – early brickfilms
The first known brickfilm, was created in 1973 by Lars C. Hassing and Henrik Hassing. The six-minute video featured both stop motion animation and live action, and was recorded on Super 8 film. It depicted Apollo 17 and was made for their grandparents' golden anniversary. The film was later shown to Godtfred Kirk Christiansen, who had a personal copy made, though the film was not released to the public until May 2013, when the creator uploaded it to YouTube.

Other early brickfilms are known to have been created from 1975 onwards, from the late 1970s to the late 1980s. Many were independent projects while others were promos or advertisements made by LEGO itself.

A well-known early brickfilm was made between 1985 and 1989 in Perth, Western Australia by Lindsay Fleay, named The Magic Portal. It was captured on a Bolex 16mm camera with 16 mm film and features animated LEGO, plasticine, and cardboard characters and objects, mixing both stop motion animation and live action footage, with Fleay making a live action appearance. The Magic Portal had high production values for a brickfilm of its time, with a five-figure budget granted by the Australian Film Commission. However, due to legal issues with The LEGO Group, it did not see a wide release for years. The LEGO Group eventually backed down on these charges.

An early brickfilm to be widely released was a music video for the UK dance act Ethereal for their song Zap on Truelove Records. Produced and released in 1989, the film was shown across the MTV network and other music channels and was the first time a full-length stop-motion brickfilm has been released across public channels. The film again attracted the attention of The LEGO Group's legal department. The film was directed by filmmaker David Betteridge with animation direction handled by Phil Burgess and Art Direction by Daniel Betteridge. The story was an interpretation of scenes from Apocalypse Now adapted to the rave culture of the late eighties, following three heroic LEGO men as they battle and overcome evil. The film's budget was £3,000 GBP, enabling the filmmakers to shoot on 35mm film using a hand-cranked camera built in 1903 and modified with an animation motor. Originally scheduled to take two weekends, the film's production took three and a half months to complete. Promo magazine at the time declared it one of the best music videos ever made.

More early brickfilms were produced in the Lego Sport Champions series, officially commissioned by The LEGO Group in 1987. During this time, Dave Lennie and Andrew Boyer started making "Legomation" using a VHS camera and professional video equipment.

1990s
In the late 1990s, the age of film and video brickfilms ended as digital cameras became more and more accessible. Also, the Internet allowed brickfilmers to produce and distribute their work more easily. The founding of Brickfilms.com in 2000 brought together the brickfilming community. The site did not directly host its members' films, but rather allowed members to link to webpages where they could be downloaded or streamed from.

Simultaneously, The LEGO Group officially encouraged the creation of brickfilms with the release of Lego Studios. Since then, The LEGO Group has used brickfilms to help advertise new themes and sets.

These actions both significantly increased brickfilming's popularity through the mid-2000s.

2000s–2020
Throughout the 2000s, brickfilms increased in sophistication and garnered some occasional media attention. Higher-end films would often feature digital effects, created frame-by-frame with image editors or inserted via video compositing software.

The Deluxe Edition DVD of Monty Python and the Holy Grail contained an extra in the form of a brickfilm of the "Camelot Song", produced by Spite Your Face Productions. Since then, several brickfilms have been placed on DVDs along with the films which they emulate, such as when Lego Star Wars: Revenge of the Brick was featured on the second DVD volume of Star Wars: Clone Wars TV series.

Brickfilms have also been released commercially on their own, such as Jericho: The Promise Fulfilled, a 30-minute-long film made by Shatter Point Entertainment, which was awarded Best Animation by the Cape Fear Independent Film Festival 2009. In 2007, the brickfilm Rick & Steve: The Happiest Gay Couple in All the World was accepted to over 80 film festivals, including Sundance.

In 2014, The LEGO Group, Warner Animation Group, and Animal Logic released LEGO's first official feature-length film, The Lego Movie. While the film was created using primarily computer generated animation, it was styled in such a way as to emulate the look of stop-motion brickfilms, even being influenced by some popular brickfilms such as The Magic Portal. Since then, LEGO has produced three more brickfilm-like feature films, The Lego Batman Movie (2017), The Lego Ninjago Movie (2017), and The Lego Movie 2: The Second Part (2019).

For years, almost all brickfilming was created using digital cameras and webcams. However, since the advent of stop-motion apps on mobile devices, brickfilming is accessible to many more people. After the release of The Lego Batman Movie, The LEGO Group produced a stop-motion animation themed construction set which was compatible with smartphones and encouraged the art of brickfilming.

Technique
Modern brickfilms are captured with digital still cameras (sometimes in the form of webcams, DSLRs or camcorders with still image capability). A widely accepted framerate for a quality brickfilm is 15 frames per second, which is a compromise between minimum production time and smoothest motion. Animators also tend to use a standard 4-frame minifigure walk cycle for this framerate. However, 12 frames per second and 24 frames per second are also widely accepted frame rates in the community. Anything lower than 12 is often considered amateurish.

Before the film is edited, the images themselves may be altered to create special effects frame-by-frame. Editing can be accomplished with almost any digital video program. However, most seasoned brickfilmers prefer to use dedicated stop motion software, such as the free MonkeyJam, Helium Frog Animator, and Eagle Animation, or professional software such as Dragonframe. Afterwards, compositing software such as Adobe After Effects can be used to add visual effects and a video editor can be used to compile the frames with audio tracks and complete the production of the film.

Brickfilming communities and festivals

Communities

Brickfilms.com by Brick à Brack is an online community dedicated to brickfilming. Founded December 16, 2000 by Jason Rowoldt, Brickfilms.com was the first internet brickfilming community ever created.
The website hosts a brickfilm directory, threads for filmmakers, technical articles, resources and organizes many brickfilm contests. In 2007 the site was the Internet's "main hub for Lego filmmaking", according to the Wall Street Journal. Brickfilms.com was acquired by the French non-profit organization Brick à Brack in 2022. This group of brickfilm enthusiasts also contribute to many LEGO events to share the art of the brickfilming with many AFOL (Adult Fan Of Lego) and TFOL (Teenager Fan Of Lego). It is currently the largest active brickfilming community on the Internet.

Bricks in Motion is a website focused on the art of brickfilming. It was originally founded in 2001 as the personal website of pioneering brickfilmer Thomas Foote, and the current incarnation was founded by Jonathan Schlaepfer in 2008 as a new community-focused brickfilming website, featuring a forum and later a film directory. It became the main home of the English-speaking brickfilming community following an exodus from Brickfilms.com beginning in 2008. The current site administrators are Chris Wynn and Sean Willis.

Film festivals
There are many film festivals in the brickfilming community that are dedicated entirely to the screen of brickfilms. A few notable festivals are the Brickworld Film Festival, based in Chicago, Cine Brick, a Portugal-based brickfilming festival, and Steinerei, a German brickfilming festival.

Documentary

The owner of the Bricks In Motion website, Philip Heinrich, and his production company, Ergo Possum, started a Kickstarter campaign to crowdsource the funding of his feature-length movie, Bricks in Motion: The Documentary, which is a documentary that follows brickfilmers from around the world and showcases their diverse personalities and their love for the craft, reaching a total of $12,800 and starting production in 2014. Production was completed in December 2015, and the film was released on various streaming services in 2017.

See also
 Lego
 Animation

References

External links

Official LEGO Company website
Brick à Brack
Bricks in Motion
WMBF.pl
Brickfilms.com

Lego films
Stop motion
Animation techniques
Hobbies